Hewett is an unincorporated community in Boone County, West Virginia, United States. Hewett has a post office with ZIP code 25108.

The community takes its name from nearby Hewett Creek.

References

Unincorporated communities in Boone County, West Virginia
Unincorporated communities in West Virginia